Kızılırmak may refer to:
 Kızılırmak, Çankırı, a town and district in Central Anatolia, Turkey
 Kızılırmak River, Turkey
 Kızılırmak Delta
 Kızılırmak toothcarp, a species of fish
 Erkut Kızılırmak (born 1969), Turkish motor racing driver
 , a Turkish folk music group

See also
 

Turkish-language surnames